Lir Sukhteh-ye Ludab (also Romanized as Līr Sūkhteh-ye Lūdāb; also known as Līr Sūkhteh) is a village in Ludab Rural District, Ludab District, Boyer-Ahmad County, Kohgiluyeh and Boyer-Ahmad Province, Iran. At the 2006 census, its population was 45, in 10 families.

References 

Populated places in Boyer-Ahmad County